Simulacrum is an album composed by John Zorn featuring John Medeski, Matt Hollenberg and Kenny Grohowski which was released on the Tzadik label in March 2015.

Reception

PopMatters reviewer John Garratt stated "The album plays around with several styles and can conjure up a three-dimensional mood when it needs to, but the prevailing winds blow it into seas of heavy metal… with an organ. ...Simulacrum shows that we’re bound to mislabel something of Zorn’s even within the confines of one recording. And if that isn’t some form of creativity, then I guess I don’t know what is". Avant Music news said "Medeski brings a unique jazz and blues inflection to the mix.  While Hollenberg’s guitar often takes the lead, Medeski occasionally takes over, building tense, swirling themes.  Grohowski mostly avoids blast-beats, and instead relies on punctuated drumming with rapid fills.  As a result, even though the 43 minutes of Simulacrum covers a variety metal tropes, albeit with organ-based atmospherics, the ultimate outcome is a fresh sound".

Track listing
All compositions by John Zorn.
 "The Illusionist" - 12:02  
 "Marmarath" - 5:18  
 "Snakes and Ladders" - 5:28  
 "Alterities" - 2:49  
 "Paradigm Shift" - 4:35  
 "The Divine Comedy" - 12:54

Personnel
John Medeski - organ
Matt Hollenberg - guitar
Kenny Grohowski - drums

Production
Marc Urselli - engineer, audio mixer
John Zorn and Kazunori Sugiyama – producers

References
 

2015 albums
John Zorn albums
Albums produced by John Zorn
Tzadik Records albums